The Pennsylvania Railroad no. 1320 was a single experimental passenger three-cylinder compound 2-2-2-0 locomotive purchased by the Pennsylvania Railroad in 1889, based on the London & North Western Railway's Dreadnought class, designed by Francis Webb. As the London & North Western's Crewe Works, which had built the Dreadnought classes, was not legally allowed to sell its locomotives, 1320 was instead constructed by Beyer, Peacock & Company in Manchester to the Dreadnought's specifications.

Design

As the two pairs of driving wheels were not connected, the locomotives were "duplex drive" or "double-singles".  

The locomotive performed poorly for the Pennsylvania, being slow and weak compared to the road's other, domestically purchased locomotives, as well as unsuited to the rougher trackage common of U.S. railroads. The unique design of the cylinders made the locomotive difficult to operate and maintain, making it unpopular among the road's engineers and management staff.  The locomotive was scrapped in 1897.

Notes

References

External links
Picture of this locomotive (ETH Zurich)

Beyer, Peacock locomotives
Compound locomotives
Duplex locomotives
Individual locomotives of the United States
Pennsylvania Railroad locomotives
Railway locomotives introduced in 1889
Standard gauge locomotives of the United States
Steam locomotives of the United States
2-2-2-0 locomotives